Sigmund Eisner (1920–2012) was an American scholar of medieval literature. A professor emeritus at the University of Arizona, he was a noted expert on Geoffrey Chaucer and was frequently consulted on matters of astronomy in Chaucer.

Biography
Eisner was born in Red Bank, New Jersey, on December 9, 1920, but was raised in the San Francisco Bay Area. He enrolled at the University of Arizona in 1939, but joined the army after the Second World War. He graduated from the University of California at Berkeley in 1947 and received his Doctor of Philosophy degree from Columbia University in 1955, then was a Fulbright Scholar in Ireland.

Eisner taught at Oregon State University and Dominican College before returning to the University of Arizona, where he taught for over forty years. He died on December 18, 2012.

Select bibliography
A Tale of Wonder. A Source Study of The Wife of Bath's Tale (Wexford: John English, 1957)
The Tristan Legend: A Study in Sources (Evanston: Northwestern UP, 1969)
Geoffrey Chaucer, A Treatise on the Astrolabe. Variorum Edition of the Works of Geoffrey Chaucer 6 (Norman: U of Oklahoma P, 2006; ed. with Marijane Osborn)

References

1920 births
2012 deaths
Academics from New Jersey
American academics of English literature
American people of Bohemian descent
Columbia University alumni
Oregon State University faculty
People from Red Bank, New Jersey
University of Arizona faculty
University of California, Berkeley alumni
Writers from the San Francisco Bay Area
United States Army personnel of World War II